Wilhelm Kirschner, nicknamed Kiri, (9 December 1911 – 26 March 1994) was a Romanian male handball player. He was a member of the Romania men's national handball team. He was a part of the  team at the 1936 Summer Olympics, playing 3 matches and scoring two goals. On club level he played for Hermannstädter Turnverein in Romania.

References

1911 births
1994 deaths
Field handball players at the 1936 Summer Olympics
Olympic handball players of Romania
Romanian male handball players
Sportspeople from Sibiu